Portrait of a Queen is a play about the life of Queen Victoria based on her letters. Dorothy Tutin played the role of Victoria on the West End and Broadway.

The play was profiled in the William Goldman book The Season: A Candid Look at Broadway.

References

External links
 

1968 plays